Batatais is a municipality in the state of São Paulo in Brazil.

History
The settlement became a town and an independent municipality on March 14, 1839, when it was separated from Franca. It became a city in 1875.  Washington Luís, president of Brazil around 1929, was the city mayor in 1899.

Geography
The elevation is 862 m. The city is in Brazil's sugarcane belt.

Population 

In 2020 the population is about 62,980. The population is mostly formed by Italian-Brazilians. There is commemorated the "San Gennaro Party" that is an example of culture predominance.

Theories on the origin of the name 
There are at least four theories for the meaning of the name "Batatais": 
The most accepted one is based on historical reports, linked to the Native Americans that lived there and their agricultural activity. The Bandeirantes may have found a large culture of purple sweet potatoes (Batatais sounds like Batatas, "potatoes").  
Another version came from the Native American language spoken there, and the name came from the word "BAITATA", which means according to some experts "river running through the rocks", meaning the waterfalls that exists there.
A third version also from the Native American language spoken there says that the name came from the word "MBOITATA", snake of fire, which on the native belief was the god that protects the field from fires. This version can be also verified due to some small gas fields that exists around the city, which may generate fireballs due to the heat occasionally. 
Some recent studies also brings another possible version: Batatais or Batatal was an expression used by the old miners to describe the place where gold can be found at the surface. As this region was part of the old way to the Goias mines, it is possible that the city was a rest place for the travelers.

Notable people
[[Zeca Lopes]], footballer
Marcelo Batatais, footballer
Emerson César dos Santos, footballer
José Guilherme Baldocchi, footballer, world champion of soccer in the 1970 FIFA World Cup

References

Municipalities in São Paulo (state)
Populated places established in 1839